Morpho zephyritis, the Zephyritis morpho, is a Neotropical butterfly found in Bolivia and Peru.

External links
"Morpho Fabricius, 1807" at Markku Savela's Lepidoptera and Some Other Life Forms
Butterflies of America Images of  type

Morpho